The Vanity Pool is a lost 1918 American silent film drama directed by Ida May Park and starring Mary MacLaren, Anna Q. Nilsson, and Thomas Holding. The script was based on a short story by Nalbro Bartley that was originally published in Young's Magazine. The film was produced and distributed by Universal Film Manufacturing Company. The film centered around a female lobbyist who becomes involved in political intrigue when she begins lobbying for the election of her friend's husband.

Cast
Mary MacLaren as Marna Royal
Anna Q. Nilsson as Carol Harper
Thomas Holding as Gerald Harper
Marin Sais as Diana Casper
Virginia Chester as Mrs. Royal
Franklyn Farnum as Drew Garrett
Winter Hall as Uncle Penny
Frank Brownlee as Jarvis Flint
Willis Marks as Mr. Royal 
Mae Talbot as Miss Key

References

External links

1918 films
American silent feature films
Lost American films
Universal Pictures films
Films directed by Ida May Park
American black-and-white films
Silent American drama films
1918 drama films
Films based on works by Nalbro Bartley
1910s American films